Angela Christine Ruch (née Cope, pronounced "ruck") (born August 18, 1983) is an American professional stock car racing driver. She is the niece of Derrike Cope and the sister of Amber Cope. She last competed in the NASCAR Gander RV & Outdoors Truck Series, driving the No. 00 Chevrolet Silverado/Toyota Tundra for Reaume Brothers Racing.

Racing career
Angela and Amber Cope became the third generation of Copes to enter into the world of racing. They started racing go-karts in the Greater Puget Sound area after their parents gave them a go-kart for Christmas at age 9. In their seven years of driving go-karts in the Pacific Northwest, Angela and her sister earned 50 wins and 20 pole positions combined. Angela also set new track records at five of six tracks in the same region.

At age 15, both Angela and Amber progressed to racing late models. In 2000, they were featured on The Early Show with host Bryant Gumbel during their career in late models.

As Angela and Amber became more experienced behind the wheel, they knew that in order to advance their careers and have the chance at driving in NASCAR, they would have to leave Washington, so they moved across the country to the Charlotte metropolitan area, where most of the race teams are located. Putting their focus into learning the in and outs of professional racing, the twins traveled with their uncle Derrike to every Cup race that he was competing in.

In 2006, the twins split seat time in the ARCA Re/Max Series at Berlin, Gateway, Chicagoland, Milwaukee and Toledo. Angela's starts were at Berlin in the No. 1 for Andy Belmont and Milwaukee in the No. 72 for Mario Gosselin. After not making any ARCA starts in 2007, Angela returned for one race in the series in 2008 at Kentucky Speedway. Driving the No. 68 Dodge for Rick Markle, she qualified eighth and finished 29th. Amber was also in this race, qualifying 15th and finishing 38th in the No. 70 car for her uncle's team.

In 2011, Angela competed in four Nationwide Series races. In 2012, she was announced to share the No. 24 SR2 Motorsports Toyota in the series with her twin sister and Benny Gordon on a part-time schedule. 

Five years later, she made her return to NASCAR's Xfinity Series at Kentucky Speedway, now going by Angela Ruch after getting married during her time without a ride. She drove the No. 78 B. J. McLeod Motorsports Chevrolet.

In 2019, Ruch returned to the Gander Outdoors Truck Series with NEMCO Motorsports. She finished a NASCAR career-best 8th at Daytona, her first lead lap finish and the second-highest ever for a female in the Truck Series. In March, Ruch and Niece Motorsports announced she would be tapped to race 12 events in the Gander Outdoors Truck Series starting at Texas Motor Speedway.

It was announced on January 29, 2020 that Ruch would run a full-time Truck schedule in 2020, driving the No. 00 Chevrolet/Toyota for Reaume Brothers Racing with an alliance with Niece Motorsports, who she drove for in 2019. After running the first five races, Ruch missed the Pocono Raceway event due to sponsorship issues and was replaced by team owner Josh Reaume in the No. 00.

Motorsports career results

NASCAR
(key) (Bold – Pole position awarded by qualifying time. Italics – Pole position earned by points standings or practice time. * – Most laps led.)

Xfinity Series

Gander RV & Outdoors Truck Series

ARCA Re/Max Series
(key) (Bold – Pole position awarded by qualifying time. Italics – Pole position earned by points standings or practice time. * – Most laps led.)

 Season still in progress
 Ineligible for series points

References

External links
 
 
 Cope twins hope to mix fashion, fierce racing in NASCAR. Sports Illustrated, February 8, 2011.
 Truck Series is about to get a double injection of style. NASCAR. January 15, 2010.

Living people
1983 births
Sportspeople from Puyallup, Washington
Racing drivers from Washington (state)
NASCAR drivers
ARCA Menards Series drivers
American twins
Cope family
American female racing drivers
Twin sportspeople
People from Davidson, North Carolina